Papayiannis is a Greek surname Παπαγιάννης. Notable people with the surname include:

Manos Papayiannis (born 1966), Greek fashion model and actor
Thodoros Papayiannis, Greek sculptor

See also
Athina Papayianni (born 1980), Greek race walker

Greek-language surnames